Matacapan or Matacapan Piedra is a Classic era archaeological site in present-day Mexican state of Veracruz situated in the Sierra de Los Tuxtlas (Tuxtla Mountains), near Catemaco.

Mesoamerican sites
Archaeological sites in Veracruz
Los Tuxtlas